Howard Dennis McNamara (November 22, 1891 – September 24, 1940) was a Canadian professional ice hockey defenceman. He played professionally from 1908 to 1920, including two seasons with the Montreal Canadiens, including the 1916 Stanley Cup champions. McNamara is the younger brother of Harold and George, who also played professionally.

Playing career
Born in Randolph, Ontario, Howard moved to Sault Ste. Marie when he was 12 years old.  Along with George, he joined the Halifax Crescents in the Maritime Professional Hockey League in 1911–12, thus forming the "Dynamite Twins".  The pair were unusually large for players of that era and formed a formidable defensive pair.  Howard moved on to become captain of the Montreal Canadiens of the National Hockey Association when they won their first Stanley Cup in 1916. McNamara played in an exhibition series in 1912–13 with the Toronto Tecumsehs.

Personal life
Both Howard and his brother George served in World War I. George rose in the ranks from lieutenant to major.  After returning from Europe, George and Howard founded the McNamara Construction Company and developed it into a prosperous firm.

Howard McNamara died of heart seizure on his yacht "Brigadier" during a fishing trip near Deseronto, Ontario.

Career statistics

Regular season and playoffs

References

External links
 
 

1891 births
1940 deaths
Canadian ice hockey defencemen
Canadian military personnel of World War I
Cobalt Silver Kings players
Ice hockey people from Ontario
Montreal Canadiens (NHA) players
Montreal Canadiens players
Stanley Cup champions
Toronto 228th Battalion players
Toronto Ontarios players
Toronto Shamrocks players
Toronto Tecumsehs players
Canadian Expeditionary Force soldiers